Dieter Schmitt (born 3 May 1940) is a German fencer. He represented the United Team of Germany at the 1964 Summer Olympics in the individual foil event.

References

External links
 

1940 births
Living people
German male fencers
Olympic fencers of the United Team of Germany
Fencers at the 1964 Summer Olympics
Sportspeople from Offenbach am Main